Louis William Marini Jr. (born May 13, 1945), known as "Blue Lou" Marini,  is an American saxophonist, arranger, and composer. He is best known for his work in jazz, rock, blues, and soul music, as well as his association with The Blues Brothers.

Early life

Marini was born in Charleston, South Carolina. His parents were Italian immigrants from the region of Trentino. He graduated from Fairless High School in Navarre, Ohio. His father, Lou Marini Sr., was the high school's band director and wrote the school song. Fairless bestows the annual Lou Marini Award in honor of Marini Sr. who died in May 2008. Both Lou Marini Sr. and Lou Marini Jr. were inducted into the Fairless Alumni Association Hall of Honor in May 2010. In June 2010, Marini Jr. was named artistic director at the first Brianza Blues Festival, in Villa Reale (Monza, Italy).
Marini attended North Texas State University College of Music (now known as the University of North Texas College of Music), where he played in the One O'Clock Lab Band. From 1972 to 1974 he played in Blood, Sweat & Tears. From 1975 to 1983, he was a member of the Saturday Night Live house band. He was a member of The Blues Brothers band, appearing in The Blues Brothers movie and its sequel, Blues Brothers 2000, playing the part of "Blue Lou", a moniker given by Dan Aykroyd.

He played on Frank Zappa's 1977 album Zappa in New York, on Cindy Bullens' 1978 album Desire Wire, and has worked with Aerosmith, Deodato, Maureen McGovern, Steely Dan, James Taylor, Dionne Warwick, the Buddy Rich Big Band, and the Woody Herman Orchestra.

Solo work
Marini has spent most of his professional life working as a sideman and arranger. In 1986, he recorded a mournful, melancholy solo sax for the soundtrack of HBO's 1987 animated adaptation of Bernard Waber's children's book The House on East 88th St. which was released under the title Lyle, Lyle Crocodile. In 2004, he recorded his first recording as a bandleader, with Ray Reach and the Magic City Jazz Orchestra, titled Lou's Blues (2004). This album features his arrangements and compositions, many of which have become favorites for the Lab Bands at the University of North Texas. The liner notes of the album were written by Grammy Award-winning composer, arranger, and producer Bob Belden.

On March 23, 2010, he released Blue Lou and Misha Project - Highly Classified, a collaboration with Misha Segal, an Israeli pianist and composer.

Compositions and arrangements
Marini's work as an arranger and composer has been influenced by Gil Evans, Bob Brookmeyer, Thad Jones, and Don Ellis, as well as rock, pop, and avant-garde music. For example, his song, "Hip Pickles," written for Blood, Sweat and Tears, is described by reviewer Jack Bowers of AllAboutJazz.com, as follows: "Marini's unorthodox notions surface on 'Hip Pickles,' whose free' intro gives way to a melody played by screaming trumpets and Clapton-like guitar, prefacing a stormy interchange between Marini (alto) and Tom Wolfe [on guitar]."

Discography

Solo
 Lou's Blues 2001
 Highly Classified 2010
 Starmaker  2012

As guest
With The Blues Brothers
 Briefcase Full of Blues 1978
 The Blues Brothers: Music from the Soundtrack 1980
 Made in America 1980
 Best of The Blues Brothers 1981 
 Dancin' wid da Blues Brothers 1983 
 The Blues Brothers Band Live in Montreux 1990 
 Red, White & Blues 1992 
 The Very Best of The Blues Brothers 1995 
 Blues Brothers & Friends: Live from Chicago's House of Blues 1997
 Blues Brothers 2000 1998

With Maureen McGovern
  Naughty Baby 1989
  Baby I'm Yours 1992
 Out of This World 1996
 Music Never Ends 1997

With John Tropea 
 Short Trip to Space 1977
 To Touch You Again 1979
 NYC Cats Direct 1985
 The Chick Corea Songbook is a studio album released by The Manhattan Transfer on September 29, 2009.[1] Play Flute & Alto Flute in 6 Song "500 Miles High"

With Frank Zappa
 Zappa in New York 1978
 You Can't Do That On Stage Anymore, Vol. 6 1992
 Läther 1996
 Have I Offended Someone? 1997

With others
 Aerosmith – Night in the Ruts 1979
 Larry Applewhite – Larry Applewhite 1979
 Jesse Austin – Baby's Back 1995
 Patti Austin – Havana Candy 1977
 Carolyn Blackwell Sings Bernstein 1996
 Blood, Sweat & Tears – New Blood (1972)
 Blood, Sweat & Tears – No Sweat (1973)
 Boyzz – Too Wild to Tame 1978
 Brecker Brothers – Don't Stop the Music 1980
 Jimmy Buffett – Off to See the Lizard 1989
 Cindy Bullens – Desire Wire 1978
 Ann Hampton Callaway – Bring Back Romance 1994
 Cameo – Feel Me 1980
 Dina Carroll – So Close 1993
 Closer Than Ever – Closer Than Ever 1990
 Freddy Cole – It's Crazy, But I'm In Love1996
 Hank Crawford – Groove Master 1990
 Hank Crawford – South Central 1992
 Deodato – Night Cruiser 1980
 Manu Dibango – Gone Clear 1980
 Manu Dibango – Ambassador 1981
 Amy Drinkwater – With All My Heart – A Journey to the Soul 2005
 Cornell Dupree – Coast to Coast 1988
 Eric Essix – SuperBlue 2006
 Donald Fagen – Kamakiriad 1993
 Family Thing – Family Thing 1996
 Robben Ford – Inside Story 1979
 Aretha Franklin – Get It Right (1983)
 Michael Franks – Tiger in the Rain 1979
 The J. Geils Band – Freeze Frame The J. Geils Band – Houseparty: Anthology 1992
 Michael Gibbs – Big Music 1988
 Levon Helm – Levon Helm & the RCO All-Stars 1977
 Levon Helm – Levon Helm 1978
 Lena Horne – Live On Broadway 1981
 Bobbi Humphrey – Good Life 1979
 Denise Jannah – I Was Born In Love With You 1995
 Garland Jeffreys – Guts for Love 1983
 Eddie King – Another Cow's Dead 1997
 D.C. LaRue – Laso 1977
 D. C. Larue – Ten Dance 1977
 Fred Lipsius - Better Believe It (mja Records, 1996)
 Love & Money – Strange Kind of Love 1988
 Melanie – Phonogenic – Not Just Another Pretty Face 1978
 Magnet – Worldwide Attraction 1979
 Mike Mandel – Sky Music 1978
 Meat Loaf – Dead Ringer 1981
 Elliott Murphy – Night Lights 1976
 Walter Murphy – A Fifth of Beethoven 1976
 Milton Nascimento – Angelus (flute) 1994
 Claude Nougaro – Nougayork 1987
 Laura Nyro – Walk the Dog and Light the Light 1993
 Linda Clifford – I'll Keep on Loving You 1982
 Jill O'Hara – Jill O'Hara 1993
 One O'clock Lab Band – Best of One O'clock 1992
 Eddie Palmieri – Unfinished Masterpiece 1990
 Tom Pierson – Planet of Tears 1996
 Andy Pratt – Shiver in the Night 1977
 Raw Stylus – Pushing Against the Flow 1995
 Lou Reed – Sally Can't Dance 1974
 Repercussions – Earth and Heaven 1995
 Jess Band Roden – Player Not the Game 1977
 Joe Roccisano – Shape I'm In 1993
 Joe Roccisano – Leave Your Mind Behind 1995
 Lalo Schifrin – Towering Toccata 1976
 Neil Sedaka – A Song 1977
 Carly Simon – Hello Big Man 1983
 Ray Simpson – Ray Simpson 1992
 Phoebe Snow – Something Real 1989
 Spyro Gyra – City Kids 1983
 Marvin Stamm – Stampede 1983
 Ringo Starr – Ringo's Rotogravure 1976
 Steely Dan – Two Against Nature 2000
 Sunshine – Sunshine (1972)
 T. Life – That's Life 1978
 Kate Taylor – Kate Taylor 1978
 B.J. Thomas – Songs 1973
 B.J. Thomas – Longhorn & London Bridges 1974
 Harvey Thomas – Highways of Gold 1995
 Peter Tosh – Mystic Man 1979
 Peter Tosh – Wanted Dread & Alive 1981
 Luther Vandross – Forever, For Always, For Love 1982
 Thijs Van leer – Nice to Have Met You 1978
 Dionne Warwick – Dionne Warwick Sings Cole Porter 1990*

References

External links
 Official website
 Official website of Ray Reach
 Lou's Blues - Lou Marini and the Magic City Jazz Orchestra reviewed at All About Jazz
 Article - Lou Marini : "Blue Lou" Blows On from One FInal Note Jazz Webzine
 Intervista a Lou Marini

1945 births
Living people
American jazz composers
American male jazz composers
American jazz saxophonists
American male saxophonists
American music arrangers
Blood, Sweat & Tears members
Record producers from South Carolina
Rhythm and blues saxophonists
Saturday Night Live Band members
The Blues Brothers members
University of North Texas College of Music alumni
People from Navarre, Ohio
21st-century saxophonists
American people of Italian descent